Joe Ingram Key is an island in the Florida Keys in Monroe County, Florida, United States. It is within the boundaries of the Key West National Wildlife Refuge.

Located in the Outlying Islands of the Florida Keys, it is in the southern Mule Keys that are 9 miles (15 km) west of Key West.

It is the smallest of the Mule Keys.  The key was named after former U.S Coast Guard Petty Officer Joseph Ingram following the 2004 midnight rescue of four fisherman adrift south of the key.

References

Islands of the Florida Keys
Islands of Monroe County, Florida
Islands of Florida